The 2020–21 Mumbai City FC season was the seventh season in the history of Indian Super League club Mumbai City. After failing to qualify for the playoffs the previous season, head coach Jorge Costa was relieved of his duties and replaced by Goa head coach Sergio Lobera.

Senior squad

Out on loan

Squad changes

In

Out

Competitions

Pre-season and friendlies

Overview

Indian Super League

League table

Results by matchday

Matches

Play-offs

Statistics

Goal scorers

Clean sheets

Notes

References

Mumbai City FC seasons
2020–21 Indian Super League season by team